Samuel Harrison Elrod (May 1, 1856 – July 13, 1935) was an American attorney and the fifth Governor of South Dakota. Elrod, a Republican from Clark, South Dakota, served from 1905 to 1907.

Biography

Elrod was born in Coatesville, Indiana. He attended public school in Coatesville and graduated from DePauw University in 1882 and studied law.  He married Mary Ellen Masten and they had two children.

Career
Elrod moved to Clark, Dakota Territory and practiced law, was a real estate broker, and a farmer. He served as a member of the Sioux Falls Constitutional Convention in 1883, as Clark County (Dakota Territory) Attorney in 1884, as Clerk Postmaster from 1885 to 1887, as State Attorney from 1887 to 1897, and as U.S. Bureau of Indian Affairs Disbursing Agent from 1892 until 1900.

A successful Republican nominee, Elrod was elected Governor of South Dakota four years later. He continued the policies of his predecessor-Charles Herreid-controlling political party machinery in South Dakota. During his tenure, he served as chairman of the building committee for the state capitol.

Elrod did not seek reelection. Following his term as governor, he practiced law and farmed near Clark, South Dakota.

Death and legacy
Elrod died July 13, 1935 and is interred at Rose Hill Cemetery, Clark, South Dakota. The town of Elrod in Clark County was named for him.

References

External links
National Governors Association

1856 births
1935 deaths
People from Hendricks County, Indiana
DePauw University alumni
Republican Party governors of South Dakota
People from Clark, South Dakota